Events from the year 1642 in Ireland.

Incumbent
Monarch: Charles I

Events
 February – English Protestant refugees are massacred at Shrule by Edmond Bourke's soldiers.
 19 March – the citizens of Galway seize an English naval ship and close the town gates in support of the Irish Rebellion of 1641.
 26 March – Siege of Drogheda broken by English reinforcements.
 14 April – Battle of Kilrush: English troops under the James Butler, Earl of Ormonde defeat Irish rebels under James's cousin, Richard Butler, 3rd Viscount Mountgarret.
 July – Battle of Liscarroll: Murrough O'Brien, 1st Earl of Inchiquin, leading an English force, routs an Irish rebel army under Garret Barry advancing on Cork.
 4 August – Alexander Forbes, 10th Lord Forbes, relieves Forthill and besieges Galway.
 c. August – Covenanter Campbell soldiers of the Argyll's Foot, encouraged by their commanding officer Sir Duncan Campbell of Auchinbreck, massacre the Catholic MacDonald residents of Rathlin Island.
 7 September – Lord Forbes raises his unsuccessful siege of Galway.
 October – largely-Catholic Royalist Confederate Ireland established, based in Kilkenny; start of the Irish Confederate Wars.
 24 October – the first Confederate Assembly is held in Kilkenny where it sets up a provisional government.
 c. 14 November – the Confederate Assembly elects a Supreme Council.
 The Presbytery of Ulster, a predecessor of the Presbyterian Church in Ireland, is created by chaplains of the Presbyterian Scottish army in Ulster.

Births

Deaths
 7 February – William Bedell, Church of Ireland Bishop of Kilmore (b. 1571)
 6 June – Robert Digby, 1st Baron Digby, peer and Governor of King's County.
 29 September – David Barry, 1st Earl of Barrymore, dies of wounds received at the Battle of Liscarroll (b. 1604)

References

 
1640s in Ireland
Ireland
Years of the 17th century in Ireland